CAFS may refer to:

 Compressed air foam system, a system used in firefighting to deliver fire retardant foam to a fire
 Content Addressable File Store, a hardware device developed by International Computers Limited that provided a disk storage with built-in search capability

See also
 CAF (disambiguation)